Batavi (Latin for Batavians) is an open-source webshop under the GNU General Public License. The development of Batavi started in 2007 inspired by a preliminary osCommerce 3.0 version, a version that seemed to be never finished by the osCommerce team. In Batavi, an Object oriented design model is adopted, and on a functional level XML-EDI integration with the systems of suppliers is a lead theme, as most merchants don't run 'standalone' webshops. This distinguishes Batavi also from other webshops like PrestaShop, Zen Cart and Magento.

Batavi is developed on LAMP (software bundle), especially PHP and MySQL, and adopts a three layer model in which design objects, code and the database are strictly separated. From a designer perspective, this creates the advantage of easy manipulation of template objects, without the need of adapting code.

Key Features (1.0 version)
 Fully flexible template system, including pages/boxes groups layout and page access limitation
 Full content management including menus, texts, mails, pages etc.
 Robust architecture to process vast numbers of products, visitors, customers and orders
 Customer/group specific pricing, payment or shipping modules
 Related products for cross- and upselling
 Unlimited product segmentation to present products
 Product price rules for pricing vast numbers of products
 Product group price rules to make selecting products easier for pricing purposes
 Fully automated integration with product content providers: Open ICEcat interface available
 Interface for multi warehouse and multi supplier (including stock and purchase prices) support
 Possibilities to filter certain UNSPSC during import
 Integration possibilities for Google Analytics
 Integration possibilities with a number of payment providers (PayPal, iDeal, MrCash etc.)
 Advanced batch price list import and order export & status feedback facilities (e.g. interfaces to ICEimport/ICEorder)
 A big group of modules like: Product Tax Modules, Realtime modules, Order total modules, GeoIP modules, Coupons etc.
 Automatic Brand pages
 Standard Open Catalog Interface to Open ICEcat XML.

History
The Batavi development team was formed in 2007 together with ICEshop, an ecommerce service provider active since 1999. The name Batavi was chosen, as this refers to a partly mythical Germanic tribe which revolted against The (Roman) Empire, and whose living territory overlaps with the present-day Netherlands. It also refers to the Golden Age of The Republic of The Netherlands, in which Batavian myths were used for inspiration.
The Batavi core team made use of an unfinished pre-release of osCommerce 3.0, and reworked it completely, and added the much needed high-end business-to-business functionalities that were already present in ICEshop's ecommerce solutions.

References

18 Great Shopping Carts to Power Your Online Store
The E-commerce Site: Batavi open source e-commerce
Channelweb (Dutch): Downloadversie Batavi open source tradershop live
Webwinkel Blog (Dutch): Eerste webshop online met Batavi
Open Business Revolution: Batavi V0.9 beta now downloadable

External links
Official Batavi website—the Batavi site is gone; it now permanently redirects to iceshop.biz
SourceForge download site

Free e-commerce software
Software forks